Daoxing Xia is a Chinese American mathematician. He is currently a professor at the Department of Mathematics, Vanderbilt University in the United States. He was elected an academician of the Chinese Academy of Science in 1980.

Career
Xia was born on October 20, 1930 in Taizhou, Jiangsu. He pursued his undergraduate studies at the Department of Mathematics at Shandong University and subsequently obtained his postgraduate degree from the Department of Mathematics at Zhejiang University in 1952. His advisor was Chen Jiangong, a pioneer of modern Chinese mathematics who was then dean of the Department of Mathematics.

In 1952, Xia went to Fudan University in Shanghai as an assistant. In 1954 he became a lecturer and in 1956 he received a position as an associate professor. In September 1957, he was sent to Moscow State University in the USSR where he did one year of research.

In 1978 he obtained his professorship at Fudan University and rose to the position of vice director of the university's Mathematics Research Institute. In 1980 he was elected a member of the Chinese Academy of Science. He was also an adjunct professor in the Chinese Academy of Science Mathematical Physics Research Institute and the Department of Mathematics at Shandong University. Xia was a visiting professor of many universities and gave lectures.

In 1984 he went to the United States to become a professor at the Department of Mathematics, Vanderbilt University.

Bibliography
 Spectral Theory of Hyponormal Operators, by Daoxing Xia, Springer Verlag (January 1984)
 Spectral Theory of Linear Operators, (with S. Yan), Press Chinese Academy of Science, Beijing (1987).
 The Second of Functional Analysis, (with S. Yan, W. Su and Y. Tong), Press Higher Education, Beijing (1986).
 An Invitation to the Theory of Linear Topological Spaces, (with Y.L. Yang), Science & Technology Press Shanghai (1986).
 Theory of a Real Variable and Functional Analysis, (with S. Yan. Z. Wu and W. Su), Press Chinese Academy of Science, Beijing, (1980).
 Measures and Integration on Infinite-dimensional spaces, Science & Technology Press Shanghai (1965), Acad. Press, New York, London (1972).
 Theory of Functions of a Real Variable and Essentials of Functional Analysis, (with S. Yan and Z. Wu), Science & Technology Press Shanghai (1956).

References

External links

 Daoxing Xia's homepage at the Department of Mathematics, Vanderbilt University, including photo 
 Daoxing Xia's publications 
 Xia's profile in the website of Chinese Academy of Science (Branch of Shanghai) 

20th-century American mathematicians
21st-century American mathematicians
1930 births
American people of Chinese descent
Zhejiang University alumni
Members of the Chinese Academy of Sciences
Living people
Mathematicians from Jiangsu
Academic staff of Fudan University
Vanderbilt University faculty
Scientists from Taizhou, Jiangsu
Academic staff of Shandong University
People's Republic of China science writers
Writers from Taizhou, Jiangsu
Educators from Taizhou, Jiangsu